Natalia Romanova (born November 11, 1972 in Kazakhstan) is a retired Soviet Union born female volleyball player from Peru, who competed at the 2006 FIVB World Championship in Japan. Her team finished in 17th place. Natalia married Luis Duarte and got the Peruvian citizenship.

She played in Spain with the Spanish clubs CV Albacete and Voley Sanse Mepaban after being played for the Italian Palermo.

Clubs
  Olympiacos Piraeus (1997–1999)
  Panathinaikos (1999–2001)
  Regatas Lima (2001–2002)
  Città di Palermo (2002–2003)
  Albacete (2003–2008)
  Voley Sanse Mepaban (2008–2009)

Awards

National Team

Senior Team
 2005 Bolivarian Games,  Gold Medal
 2003 South American Championship,  Bronze Medal

References

External links
 FIVB Profile
 Italian League Profile

1972 births
Living people
Sportspeople from Moscow
Peruvian women's volleyball players
21st-century Peruvian women